High Mass may refer to:
 Solemn Mass, Tridentine Mass or Mass of Anglican (or Anglo-Catholic) tradition, celebrated by a priest with deacon and subdeacon (international and general United States usage)
 Missa cantata, a sung Tridentine Mass celebrated by a priest without deacon and subdeacon (usage among United States Catholics)